Viterbese Castrense are an Italian football club which are based in Viterbo. During the 2019-20 campaign they will be participating in the following competitions: Serie C, Coppa Italia, Coppa Italia Serie C.

Current squad

Competitions

Serie C

Results summary

Matches

Coppa Italia

Coppa Italia Serie C

References
1. *Italy - ADC Viterbese Castrense - Results, fixtures, squad, statistics, photos, videos and news - Soccerway
2. *

External links
Official homepage 

Viterbese
U.S. Viterbese 1908 seasons